Royal Academy of Culinary Arts (RACA) is an associate member of the network of EHL-Certified Schools is a non-profit private Jordanian institution, It was founded in 2008.

The Royal Academy of Culinary Arts opened as a Campus of Les Roches Global Hospitality Education, as the first culinary school managed and operated by them in the world. The Royal Academy of Culinary Arts (RACA) has entered into a partnership with Ecole Hôtelière de Lausanne, one of the oldest Hospitality Management schools in the world. The curriculum is entirely taught in English.

References

Educational organisations based in Jordan
Cooking schools in Asia